Marcel André (2 January 1885–13 October 1974) was a French film actor.

Selected filmography

 Si l'empereur savait ça (1930) - Albert (Master of the Horse)
 Soyons gais (1930) - Townley
 Le père célibataire (1931)
 The Trial of Mary Dugan (1931) - West
 Luck (1931) - Le docteur Gaston
 Amourous Adventure (1932) - Jacques Varnier
 Tumultes (1932) - Le commissaire
 Coup de feu à l'aube (1932) - Schmitter
 Quick (1932) - Le docteur
 Un peu d'amour (1932) - Maxime
 The Agony of the Eagles (1933) - Le préfet de police
 Dream Castle (1933) - Le metteur en scène / The film director
 Une vie perdue (1933)
 La margoton du bataillon (1933) - Le capitaine
 Léopold le bien-aimé (1934) - L'abbé
 The Concierge's Daughters (1934) - Gaston Rival
 Song of Farewell (1934) - Friedrich Karlbrenner
 Cessez le feu (1934) - Baron
 Return to Paradise (1935) - Le docteur Bouvard
 Baccara (1935) - Maître Lebel
 The First Offence (1936)
 L'argent (1936) - Delcambre
 Au service du tsar (1936) - L'amiral
 L'homme du jour (1937) - Petit rôle (uncredited)
 Culprit (1937) - Edouard
 Marthe Richard au service de la France (1937) - Le commandant Rémont
 Gribouille (1937) - L'avocat général
 Rail Pirates (1938) - Ulrich
 Le joueur (1938) - Le baron Vincent
 Adrienne Lecouvreur (1938) - Le régent
 Ultimatum (1938) - Legrain
 Hôtel du Nord (1938) - Le chirurgien
 Le Corsaire (1939)
 Night in December (1940) - James Arthur Morris
 Sarajevo (1940) - L'archiduc Frédéric
 La prière aux étoiles (1941)
 Promesse à l'inconnue (1942) - Chancellin
 Ne le criez pas sur les toits (1943) - L'avocat général
 Vautrin (1943) - Camusot
 Cecile Is Dead (1944) - Le directeur de la P.J.
 Coup de tête (1944) - Pongibaud
 La Vie de bohème (1945) - (uncredited)
 Alone in the Night (1945) - Planquine
 A Friend Will Come Tonight (1946) - Le docteur Lestrade
 Beauty and the Beast (1946) - Belle's father
 Martin Roumagnac (1946) - Le juge d'instruction (uncredited)
 Counter Investigation (1947) - Le juge d'instruction Nicolas Fournier
 Eternal Conflict (1948) - Le proviseur
 Les Parents terribles (1948) - Georges
 Blonde (1950) - L'inspecteur Paulot
 Les mains sales (1951) - Karski
 Gangsterpremiere (1951) - Alois
 They Were Five (1952) - Le commissaire
 Great Man (1951) - Le docteur Charles Tannard
 La Vérité sur Bébé Donge (1952) - Le juge d'instruction
 Leathernose (1952) - Josias
 Ouvert contre X... (1952) - Le médecin légiste
 Mon curé chez les riches (1952) - Sableuse
 Endless Horizons (1953) - Dusmesnil
 Thérèse Raquin (1953) - Michaud
 Les Intrigantes (1954) - Inspecteur Gosset
 L'homme aux clefs d'or (1956) - M. Bardot, le directeur du collège
 Les Lavandières du Portugal (1957) - Monsieur Dubois - le directeur de l'agence O.P.I.
 Different from You and Me (1957) - Travestiekünstler
 Le huitième jour (1960) - Le père de Françoise

References

Bibliography 
 Goble, Alan. The Complete Index to Literary Sources in Film. Walter de Gruyter, 1999.

External links 
 

1885 births
1974 deaths
French male film actors
Male actors from Paris